Proto-Romance is the comparatively reconstructed ancestor of all Romance languages. It reflects a late variety of spoken Latin prior to regional fragmentation.

Phonology

Vowels

Monophthongs

Diphthong 
The only phonemic diphthong was /au̯/.

Allophony 
Vowels were lengthened in stressed open syllables.
Vowel breaking: stressed /ɛ, ɔ/ may have yielded the incipient diphthongs [e͜ɛ, o͜ɔ] when followed by a syllable containing a close vowel.
Whatever the precise outcome, Maiden argues that this would have been limited, at the Proto-Romance stage, to open syllables. That is, it would have applied only to instances of /ɛ/ and /ɔ/ that had been subject to stressed-open-syllable lengthening.

Constraints 
Neither a distinct /ɛ/ nor /ɔ/ occurred in unstressed position on account of having merged into /e/ and /o/ respectively.
Neither a distinct /i/ nor /u/ occurred in the second syllable of words with the structure [ˌσσˈσσ] (such as càntatóre 'singer') on account of having merged into /ɪ/ and /ʊ/ respectively.

Consonants 

Allophony 
The following features are reconstructed with varying degrees of certainty:

A prop-vowel [ɪ] was added before word-initial /sC/ clusters not already preceded by a vowel (as in /sˈtare/ [ɪsˈtaːɾe]).
Palatalized consonants, other than /sʲ rʲ/, tended to geminate in intervocalic position, although this varied widely depending on the consonant in question. For /bʲ dʲ ɡʲ/, see below.
The sequence /ɡn/ was likely realized as [ɣn] at first, with subsequent developments varying by region.
/j/ was likely realized as [ʝ] or [ɟ], possibly with gemination in intervocalic position.
 /d/ and /ɡ/ might have been fricatives or approximants in intervocalic position.
/s/ might have been apico-alveolar.
/ll/ might have been retroflex.
/f/ might have been bilabial.

Constraints 

/b/ and /bʲ/ did not occur intervocalically on account of having merged with /β, βʲ/ (frication, spirantization, betacism).
The same may also have occurred after /r/ or /l/.
/dʲ/ and /ɡʲ/ did not occur intervocalically on account of both having merged with /j/.
/kʷ/ and /ɡʷ/ did not occur before back vowels on account of having delabialized to /k, ɡ/.

Nouns 
Proto-Romance nouns appear to have had three cases: a nominative, an accusative, and a combined genitive-dative.

Several Class III nouns had inflexions that differed by syllable count or stress position.

Some nouns were pluralized with -a or -ora, having originally been neuter in Classical Latin. Their singular was treated as grammatically masculine, while their plural was treated as feminine.

Such nouns, due to their plurals, were often reanalyzed as collective feminine nouns.

Adjectives

Positive

Comparative 
Proto-Romance inherited the comparative suffix -ior from Latin, but only in a limited number of adjectives.

Otherwise, the typical way to form a comparative seems to have been to add either plus or magis (meaning 'more') to a positive adjective.

Superlative 
With the exception of a few fossilized forms, such as /ˈpɛssɪmʊs/ 'worst', superlatives were formed by adding an intensifying adverb or prefix (/mʊltu, bɛne, per-, tras-/ etc.) to a positive adjective. Comparative forms could also have been made superlative by adding a demonstrative adjective.

Possessive 
Feminine singular forms shown below. In certain cases there was an opposition between 'strong' (stressed) and 'weak' (unstressed) variants.

Pronouns

Personal 
Numerous variant forms appear to have existed. For the third-person genitive-dative inflexions, there appears to have been an opposition between 'strong' (stressed) and 'weak' (unstressed) variants, as also with the possessive adjectives.

Relative 

The interrogative pronouns were the same, except that the neuter nominative-accusative form was /ˈkʷɪd/.

Verbs 

Proto Romance verbs belonged to three main classes, each characterized by a different thematic vowel. Their conjugations were built on three stems and involved various combinations of mood, aspect, and tense.

Present indicative

Participles 
As in Latin, present participles had an active sense and inflected like class III adjectives, while past participles had a passive sense and inflected like class I/II adjectives. Regular forms would have been as follows (in the accusative feminine singular):

See also 

 Appendix Probi
Reichenau Glossary
Lexical changes from Classical Latin to Proto-Romance
 Phonological changes from Classical Latin to Proto-Romance

Notes

References

Bibliography 
 
 
 
 

 
 
 
 
 
 
 

Forms of Latin
Romance languages
Romance